Ro clan of Kaesong is one of the Korean clans. According to the research held in 2015, the number of Ro clan of Kaesong's member was 2,232. Ro clan came from a Chinese clan. Ro clan of Kaesong's founder was  who was Yuan dynasty's Hanlin Academy. Ro Eun gyeong entered Goryeo as a fatherly master of Queen Noguk who had a marriage to an ordinary person planned by Gongmin of Goryeo in Goryeo and was settled in Kaesong.

See also 
 Korean clan names of foreign origin

References

External links 
 

 
Korean clan names of Chinese origin